Bhramarpura भ्रमरपुर is a village six kilometers west of Janakpurdham. It is the most populous village in its district. Bhramarpura is located in the Loharpatti Municipality 7, Mahottari district of Janakpur Zone of Nepal. This village has a high income because 25% of the village population is working overseas. At the time of the 2011 Nepal census, the village had a population of 9458 people living in 1734 individual households. In Dhanusha district where this village has left it name in that city calling as a Bhramarpura Chowk. People living in this village are following different religions, most of the people living in this village are Hindu or Muslim. In Hindu the castes are Brahmin, Yadav, Teli, Sudhi, Mandal, etc. In Muslim [[Dhobi][Rain people|Rain]], Nadaf, among others.

Education 
Bhramarpura has Shree Ram Dev Janta Higher Secondary School and three secondary government schools. There are multiple private boarding schools in village. Students also travel to nearby city Janakpur for school and further education.

Populated places in Mahottari District